The Kinmen County Government is the local government of the Republic of China that governs Kinmen County.

Organizational structures

Bureau
 Civil Affairs Bureau
 Finance Bureau
 Education Bureau
 Economic Development Bureau
 Public Works Bureau
 Social Affairs Bureau
 Transportation and Tourism Bureau

Office
 Research and Evaluation Office
 General Affairs Office
 Accounting and Statistics Office
 Civil Service Ethics Office
 Personnel Office

First Level Agency
 Police Bureau
 Health Bureau
 Land Administration Bureau
 Environmental Protection Bureau
 Fire Bureau
 Cultural Affairs Bureau
 Revenue Service Office

See also
 Kinmen County Council

References

External links

 

Kinmen
Local governments of the Republic of China